Erasmus for Young Entrepreneurs is a European mobility scheme initiated by the European Union in 2009, which gives new or aspiring entrepreneurs an opportunity to get a first-hand, practical coaching from experienced entrepreneurs running small and medium-sized businesses (SMEs) in one of the 28 EU Members States or in other countries part of the COSME programme.

The programme helps new and host entrepreneurs to develop relevant skills for managing and expanding their own business.

The duration of the stay abroad can be between one and six months.  The European Union provides some financial support to the new entrepreneurs for their stay abroad.

Erasmus for Young Entrepreneurs is financed by the European Commission and operates with the help of intermediary organisations competent in business support, coordinated by a Support Office (currently run by EUROCHAMBRES).

By February 2017, more than 4,500 exchanges have been established and over 15,000 applications have been received

Aim of the programme 

Erasmus for Young Entrepreneurs aims at fostering the entrepreneurial spirit and cross-border trade in Europe by facilitating exchange of knowledge, experience and networking between entrepreneurs intending to start a business or having just started one, and experienced entrepreneurs by working alongside each other.
The programme also aims at guiding businesses on how to overcome market and business obstacles, so that they can make the most of the European Single Market.
Erasmus for Young Entrepreneurs in a nutshell:

 It offers new entrepreneurs the opportunity to learn from an experienced entrepreneur who is running a small or medium-sized enterprise (SME) in another participating country,
 It enables the exchange of experience between new and experienced entrepreneurs,
 It facilitates access to new markets and the search for potential business partners,
 It enhances networking between entrepreneurs and between SMEs,
 It allows experienced entrepreneurs to develop new commercial relations and find out more about opportunities in another EU country.

History and development of Erasmus for Young Entrepreneurs 

In 2007, the European Parliament introduced a new budget line entitled "Erasmus for Young Entrepreneurs”. The European Commission then started to design the Pilot Project with the aim of supporting mobility periods abroad for recently established and nascent entrepreneurs, with a view to improving their skills and fostering the cross-border transfer of knowledge and experience between entrepreneurs.

Erasmus for Young Entrepreneurs comes under the Small Business Act for Europe which considers this initiative a key contribution “to create an environment within which entrepreneurs and family businesses can thrive and entrepreneurship is rewarded”. It currently falls under Programme for the Competitiveness of enterprises and SME's (COSME) 2014–2020.

Erasmus for Young Entrepreneurs is to a certain extent similar to the well-known Erasmus Programme for students as is a mobility action which addresses a particular target group. However, it is also clearly different: whereas the existing Erasmus programme in higher education enhances student-to-university relationships, the Erasmus for Young Entrepreneurs focuses on business-to-business relationships.

References

External links

Entrepreneurship organizations
European Commission